A red hatter could be :

 A member of the Red Hat Society
 A proponent of the Red Hat distribution of the Linux Operating System
 Someone who wears a red hat